Yitong Manchu Autonomous County (Mölendroff: itu manju beye dasangga siyan) is located in western Jilin province, People's Republic of China,  south of the provincial capital, Changchun. It comes under the administration of Siping City. More than 38% of the population are ethnic Manchus.

Yitong became an autonomous county in 1988.

Administrative divisions
The county administers 12 towns and three townships.

Climate

References

External links

 
Manchu autonomous counties
County-level divisions of Jilin
Cities in Jilin